Kamo Hovhannisyan (born on 5 October 1992) is an Armenian professional footballer who currently plays as a midfielder for Kazakhstan Premier League club Astana and the Armenia national football team.

Club career
Kamo Hovhannisyan was born in Yerevan to parents Artashes and Gayane Hovhannisyan. He began to get involved in football at the age of 6, and two years later, he was admitted to the football school Shengavit. The choice of Shengavit justified the proximity of schools to home. The family belonged to the football and loyal son to thwart the desires did not. Moreover, his younger brother, Hovhannes, also followed in the footsteps of him. In Shengavit, he spent two years, after which, at the urging of his father, he went to football school Pyunik. In the 2008 season, Hovhannisyan played for the club Patani, which assembled youth team players up to age 17. The following season, he moved back to Pyunik. Hovhannisyan played mostly in the duplicate team, which played in the First League. In 2009, he had been awarded a contract with Pyunik. His debut for the main club was in the 2009 season. It happened on 7 April, in the return game in the Armenian Cup quarterfinals against Cilicia. Hovhannisyan's Armenian Premier League debut was four days later, again against Cilicia. In both matches, Pyunik was the winner. On 12 July 2011, he made his debut in the Champions League match against Czech club Viktoria Plzeň, which ended in defeat for Pyunik - 0:4.

On 16 January 2018, FC Alashkert announced that Hovhannisyan joined the club on a contract expiring on 1 August 2020. However, on 23 January 2018, Hovhannisyan joined FC Zhetysu of the Kazakhstan Premier League. On 11 January 2020, Hovhannisyan joined FC Kairat of the Kazakhstan Premier League on a two-year contract.

On 19 January 2022, Hovhannisyan signed for Astana. On 29 December 2022, Hovhannisyan extended his contract with Astana for the 2023 season.

International career
Hovhannisyan made his debut for the Armenia national football team on 28 February 2012 in a friendly match against Serbia.

Career statistics

Club

International 

Scores and results list Armenia's goal tally first, score column indicates score after each Hovhannisyan goal.

Honours

Club

FC Kairat
Kazakhstan Premier League (1): 2020

Pyunik
Armenian Premier League (2): 2009, 2010
Armenian Cup (2): 2009, 2010
Armenian Supercup (1): 2010
Armenian Supercup Runner-up (1): 2009

References

External links
 
 Profile at ffa
 
 

1992 births
Living people
Footballers from Yerevan
Armenian footballers
Association football midfielders
Armenia international footballers
Armenian expatriate footballers
Expatriate footballers in Belarus
Expatriate footballers in Kazakhstan
Armenian Premier League players
FC Pyunik players
FC Torpedo-BelAZ Zhodino players
FC Zhetysu players
FC Kairat players
FC Astana players